Sidney John O'Neill (4 July 1888 — 7 August 1915) was an Australian rules footballer who played with Fitzroy in the Victorian Football League. He played his only league game against University, in the back pocket. He was killed in action in World War I.

Death
He was killed in action at Gallipoli on 7 August 1915.

Obituary
        SERGEANT SIDNEY JOHN O'NEILL(killed) was a son of Dr. and Mrs. O'Neill, of Kooyong road, Armadale, and was 27 years of age.Educated at Xavier College, Kew, he afterwards pursued pastoral pursuits in New South Wales and Queensland.Shortly after declaration of war he left Brisbane for Melbourne, where he enlisted, and joined the 8th Light Horse in September.He was soon promoted corporal, and at Gallipoli sergeant.Sergeant O'Neill was a great grandson of Captain James Cuncliffe, who fought at Waterloo. — The Argus, 17 September 1915.

See also
 List of Victorian Football League players who died in active service

Footnotes

References
 Holmesby, Russell & Main, Jim (2007). The Encyclopedia of AFL Footballers. 7th ed. Melbourne: Bas Publishing.
 Main, J. & Allen, D., "O'Neill, Sydney", pp.142-143 in Main, J. & Allen, D., Fallen – The Ultimate Heroes: Footballers Who Never Returned From War, Crown Content, (Melbourne), 2002.

External links
 
 

1888 births
1915 deaths
Australian rules footballers from Victoria (Australia)
Fitzroy Football Club players
Australian military personnel killed in World War I